Old Waverly may refer to:
Old Waverly Golf Club, in West Point, Mississippi
Old Waverly, Texas, an unincorporated community in Walker County, Texas